Syed Abul Maksud (23 October 1946 – 23 February 2021) was a Bangladeshi journalist, columnist, research scholar, essayist, and writer. He was acclaimed for his critical and research work. He was a regular contributor to the Daily Prothom Alo. His essays on literature, society, culture and politics are much appreciated for his clear view, lucid language and simple style. He carried out substantive research works on "the lives of famous litterateurs such as Rabindranath Tagore, Buddhadeva Bose", Mohandas Karamchand Gandhi, Syed Waliullah  etc. His Journal of Germany is a popular travel book. In 1995, he was awarded Bangla Academy Literary Award by Bangla Academy for his contributions to Bengali Literature.

Death
Maksud died at the age of 74 on the way to the hospital after falling ill on 23 February 2021.

Selected publications
Juddha O Manusher Murkhata (1988)
Maulana Abdul Hamid Khan Bhasanir jiban, Karmakanda, rajniti o darshan (1986)
Gandhi, Nehru and Noakhali (2008)
Dhakar Buddhadeb Basu (2011)
 Dhaka University & Higher Education in Bangladesh (2016)
Syed Waliullah'r Jibon O Sahitya
Rabindranather Dharmatattwa O Darshan (2012)

References

1946 births
2021 deaths
People from Manikganj District
University of Dhaka alumni
Bangladeshi columnists
Bangladeshi male writers
Bangladeshi essayists
Recipients of Bangla Academy Award
Male essayists